The Uda class, Soviet designation Project 577, is a class of replenishment oiler built for the Soviet Navy between 1962 and 1967.

Construction
Project 577 vessels were built at the Vyborg, USSR shipyard during the 1960s and were designated VTR Voyenyy Tanker, Military Tanker) by the Soviet Navy. They are capable of replenishment at sea and an A-frame kingpost provides two amidships refueling positions. They are also capable of refueling over the stern.

The Project 577 is similar in design to a US Navy AO fleet tanker or a Royal Fleet Auxiliary fleet support tanker and performs the same operational role. Unlike US or British vessels of this type, the Project 577 does not have facilities for helicopters and is incapable of vertical replenishment.

There are provisions for fitting eight ZIF-75 57mm AA guns in quad mounts, plus one MR-302 Strut Curve and two MR-103 Bars radar, but no weapons systems have been reported fitted to the Uda class since the 1960s.

Ships in class
There were nine vessels in the class.

See also
 List of ships of Russia by project number

References

External links
 Project 577 medium seagoing tanker (English)

Cold War naval ships of the Soviet Union
Oilers
Auxiliary replenishment ship classes